Gadaw (also spelt kadaw) is a Burmese verb referring to a Burmese tradition in which a person, always of lower social standing, pays respect or homage to a person of higher standing (including Buddhist monks, elders, teachers and Buddha), by kneeling before them and paying obeisance with joined hands, and bowing. This is usually done by students to their teachers or children or grandchildren to their elders (parents, aunts, uncles and grandparents), in order to show gratitude and reverence and an opportunity to ask for forgiveness, often involving gift-giving.

It is traditionally done on New Year's Day of Thingyan and during the month of Thadingyut (roughly October), which marks the end of Vassa, the Buddhist lent.

The tradition is widely believed to have Buddhist roots, as teachers and parents are honored as part of the Five Infinite Venerables, along with the Three Jewels, namely the Buddha, the Dhamma and the Sangha. Moreover, the Mangala Sutta, the source of the 38 Buddhist Beatitudes, describes the importance of "honoring those worthy of honor" and lists respect, humbleness, gratitude and as among the highest blessings. Obeisance ceremonies are also held for neighborhood elders, and professional mentors, such as writers and actors.

The collective gadaw of teachers is called a hsaya gadaw pwe or more formally acariya puja pwe or asariya puzaw pwe, usually done formally during the month of Thadingyut (or World Teachers' Day on 5 October) by students or alumni at schools and universities throughout the country.

During the time of the Burmese monarchy, a ritualized gadaw ceremony called the gadaw pwedaw was practised at least three times a year at the royal palace, by tributary chieftains and rulers as well as subjects to the king, as a symbolic form of allegiance. Gadaw nay was one such time, occurring at the end of the Buddhist lent, and when tributes and gifts are formally offered to the king.

The traditional Burmese request of the Three Jewels (Triple Gem), a formulaic prayer (termed Okāsa or the "Buddhist common prayer" by Pe Maung Tin) that precedes most Buddhist ceremonies, explicitly references the gadaw of the Five Infinite Venerables (Buddha, Dhamma, Sangha, parents and teachers):

A more ritualized form called the wai khru is found in neighboring Thailand. A similar tradition, called dam hua is practiced in the Lanna region of Northern Thailand, especially during Songkran, the Thai new year.

See also

Awgatha
Cetiya
Refuge in Buddhism
Buddhist devotion
Mingalaba

References

See also
Wai khru
Kowtow

Burmese culture
Burmese words and phrases
Gestures of respect